Andrew John Stevenson (born 4 July 1963) is a British Conservative Party politician and active solicitor and director for the firms Bendles and Tiffen Estate Agents, who was first elected at the 2010 general election as the Member of Parliament (MP) for Carlisle.

Early life 
Stevenson was state educated at Aberdeen Grammar School and graduated from the University of Dundee with Honours in History and Politics. He then studied law at Chester College before qualifying as a solicitor. He went on to become a partner in the law firm Bendles based in the centre of Carlisle.

Political career
Stevenson unsuccessfully stood as the Conservative candidate in the Denton Holme ward of Carlisle City Council in May 1998, before he was elected in another ward just one year later. Stevenson was first elected as a Conservative Councillor on Carlisle City Council in May 1999, for Stanwix Urban – a suburban ward on the northern edge of the city with the joint lowest levels of deprivation in the district. He resigned as a councillor on the 2 August 2010, shortly after his election as Member of Parliament and his party won the subsequent by-election. He has been chairman of the Carlisle Constituency Association as well as Penrith and the Border. He is the chairman of the North Cumbria Conservatives which is a federation of the four North Cumbria Constituencies.

He was first elected at the 2010 general election as the Member of Parliament (MP) for Carlisle, winning the seat from Labour after the sitting MP Eric Martlew stood down. He was subsequently re-elected in 2015, 2017 and 2019. Aside from his duties as a constituency MP, he is the chairman of the All Party Parliamentary Group (APPG) for Food and Drink which advises the direction of national policy on British food and drink manufacture.

In Parliament, Stevenson currently serves on the Standards and Privileges Committees, having previously served on the Public Administration and Constitutional Affairs Committee, the Housing, Communities and Local Government Committee, the Scottish Affairs Committee and the Draft House of Lords Reform Bill (Joint Committee).

In January 2013, Stevenson faced accusations of nepotism for employing his fiancée as a Senior Secretary. Although Stevenson said that no other applicants had been considered for the role, he argued that she was a qualified legal secretary, and still does that work when not working for him. Although MPs who were first elected in 2017 have been banned from employing family members, the restriction is not retrospective – meaning that Stevenson's employment of his wife is lawful.

In January 2014 it was reported that Stevenson was one of a group of MPs who had been charging the taxpayer to help them fill in tax forms. Part of his expenses claim was rejected, although he was not the only MP to be the subject to such action.

In May 2016, it was reported that Stevenson was one of a number of Conservative MPs being investigated by police in the United Kingdom general election, 2015 party spending investigation, for allegedly spending more than the legal limit on constituency election campaign expenses. In May 2017, the Crown Prosecution Service said that while there was evidence of inaccurate spending returns, it did not "meet the test" for further action.

Stevenson was opposed to Brexit prior to the 2016 referendum. Stevenson contributed to the Conservative Government's first defeat over key Brexit legislation in December 2017 when he declined to vote against Dominic Grieve's amendment requiring Parliament to have a vote on the final deal relating to the UK departing the European Union. Following the election of Boris Johnson as Conservative leader, Stevenson later shifted his views on the possibility of a No Deal exit from the EU saying "it may well come to being the only solution".

In August 2021, Stevenson and Peter Aldous wrote to Prime Minister Boris Johnson to call on the government to keep the £20-a-week Universal Credit uplift.

Stevenson submitted a letter of no confidence in Boris Johnson after the publication of Sue Gray's report on Partygate in May 2022.

Personal life 
Stevenson lives in the village of Great Corby, which is close to the edge of Carlisle. He is married to Tracy Nixon and they were wedded at a Church of Scotland ceremony in Carlisle in 2013.

References

External links

John Stevenson MP official constituency website
John Stevenson MP Conservative Party profile
North West Conservatives
Interview with John Stevenson MP about his election in 2010 at Catch21

1963 births
Living people
People educated at Aberdeen Grammar School
Alumni of the University of Dundee
Conservative Party (UK) MPs for English constituencies
Councillors in Cumbria
Politicians from Aberdeen
UK MPs 2010–2015
UK MPs 2015–2017
UK MPs 2017–2019
UK MPs 2019–present